Tatarməhlə (also, Tataramagla and Tatarmagla) is a village and municipality in the Neftchala Rayon of Azerbaijan.  It has a population of 1,111.  The municipality consists of the villages of Tatarməhlə and Abasallı.

References 

Populated places in Neftchala District